Interpretatio graeca (Latin, "Greek translation") or "interpretation by means of Greek [models]" is a discourse used to interpret or attempt to understand the mythology and religion of other cultures; a comparative methodology using ancient Greek religious concepts and practices, deities, and myths, equivalencies, and shared characteristics.

The phrase may describe Greek efforts to explain others' beliefs and myths, as when Herodotus describes Egyptian religion in terms of perceived Greek analogues, or when Dionysius of Halicarnassus and Plutarch document Roman cults, temples, and practices under the names of equivalent Greek deities. Interpretatio graeca may also describe non-Greeks' interpretation of their own belief systems by comparison or assimilation with Greek models, as when Romans adapt Greek myths and iconography under the names of their own gods.

Interpretatio romana is comparative discourse in reference to ancient Roman religion and myth, as in the formation of a distinctive Gallo-Roman religion. Both the Romans and the Gauls reinterpreted Gallic religious traditions in relation to Roman models, particularly Imperial cult.

Jan Assmann considers the polytheistic approach to internationalizing gods as a form of "intercultural translation":

The great achievement of polytheism is the articulation of a common semantic universe. ... The meaning of a deity is his or her specific character as it unfolded in myths, hymns, rites, and so on. This character makes a deity comparable to other deities with similar traits. The similarity of gods makes their names mutually translatable. ... The practice of translating the names of the gods created a concept of similarity and produced the idea or conviction that the gods are international.

Pliny the Elder expressed the "translatability" of deities as "different names to different peoples" (nomina alia aliis gentibus). This capacity made possible the religious syncretism of the Hellenistic era and the pre-Christian Roman Empire.

Examples

Herodotus was one of the earliest authors to engage in this form of interpretation. In his observations regarding the Egyptians, he establishes Greco-Egyptian equivalents that endured into the Hellenistic era, including Amon/Zeus, Osiris/Dionysus, and Ptah/Hephaestus. In his observations regarding the Scythians, he equates their queen of the gods, Tabiti, to Hestia, Papaios and Api to Zeus and Gaia respectively, and Argimpasa to Aphrodite Urania, whilst also claiming that the Scythians worshipped equivalents to Herakles and Ares, but which he doesn't name.

Some pairs of Greek and Roman gods, such as Zeus and Jupiter, are thought to derive from a common Indo-European archetype (Dyeus as the supreme sky god), and thus exhibit shared functions by nature. Others required more expansive theological and poetic efforts: though both Ares and Mars are war gods, Ares was a relatively minor figure in Greek religious practice and deprecated by the poets, while Mars was a father of the Roman people and a central figure of archaic Roman religion.

Some deities dating to Rome's oldest religious stratum, such as Janus and Terminus, had no Greek equivalent. Other Greek divine figures, most notably Apollo, were adopted directly into Roman culture, but underwent a distinctly Roman development, as when Augustus made Apollo one of his patron deities. In the early period, Etruscan culture played an intermediary role in transmitting Greek myth and religion to the Romans, as evidenced in the linguistic transformation of Greek Heracles to Etruscan Her[e]cle to Roman Hercules.

Interpretatio romana
The phrase interpretatio romana was first used by the Imperial-era historian Tacitus in the Germania. Tacitus reports that in a sacred grove of the Nahanarvali, "a priest adorned as a woman presides, but they commemorate gods who in Roman terms (interpretatione romana) are Castor and Pollux." Elsewhere, he identifies the principal god of the Germans as Mercury, perhaps referring to Wotan.

Some information about the deities of the ancient Gauls (the continental Celts), who left no written literature other than inscriptions, is preserved by Greco-Roman sources under the names of Greek and Latin equivalents. A large number of Gaulish theonyms or cult titles are preserved, for instance, in association with Mars. As with some Greek and Roman divine counterparts, the perceived similarities between a Gallic and a Roman or Greek deity may reflect a common Indo-European origin. Lugus was identified with Mercury, Nodens with Mars as healer and protector, Sulis with Minerva. In some cases, however, a Gallic deity is given an interpretatio romana by means of more than one god, varying among literary texts or inscriptions. Since the religions of the Greco-Roman world were not dogmatic, and polytheism lent itself to multiplicity, the concept of "deity" was often expansive, permitting multiple and even contradictory functions within a single divinity, and overlapping powers and functions among the diverse figures of each pantheon. These tendencies extended to cross-cultural identifications.

In the Eastern empire, the Anatolian storm god with his double-headed axe became Jupiter Dolichenus, a favorite cult figure among soldiers.

Application to the Jewish religion
Roman scholars such as Varro interpreted the monotheistic god of the Jews into Roman terms as Caelus or Jupiter Optimus Maximus. Some Greco-Roman authors seem to have understood the Jewish invocation of Yahweh Sabaoth as Sabazius.
In a similar vein, Plutarch gave an example of a symposium question 'Who is the god of the Jews?,' by which he meant: 'What is his Greek name?' as we can deduct from the first speaker at the symposium, who maintained that the Jews worshiped Dionysus, and that the day of Sabbath was a festival of Sabazius. We don't know what the other speakers thought, because the text is incomplete.  Tacitus, on the topic of the Sabbath, claims that "others say that it is an observance in honour of Saturn, either from the primitive elements of their faith having been transmitted from the Idæi, who are said to have shared the flight of that God, and to have founded the race", implying Saturn was the god of the Jews.

From the Roman point of view, it was natural to apply the above principle to the Jewish God. However, the Jews – unlike other peoples living under Roman rule – rejected out of hand any such attempt, regarding such an identification as the worst of sacrilege. This complete divergence of views was one of the factors contributing to the frequent friction between the Jews and the Roman Empire – for example, the Emperor Hadrian's decision to rebuild Jerusalem under the name of Aelia Capitolina, a city dedicated to Jupiter, precipitated the bloodbath of the Bar Kokhba revolt.

Emperor Julian, the 4th century pagan emperor, remarked that "these Jews are in part god-fearing, seeing that they revere a god who is truly most powerful and most good and governs this world of sense, and, as I well know, is worshipped by us also under other names".  However, Julian doesn't specify which "other names" the Jewish god was worshiped under.

In late antiquity mysticism, the sun god Helios is sometimes equated to the Judeo-Christian God.

Cross-cultural equivalencies

The following table is a list of Greek, Roman, Etruscan, Egyptian, Sumerian, Phoenician, Hindu, Parthian, Celtic, and Norse equivalencies via the interpretationes. These are not necessarily gods who share similar traits (as viewed by modern scholarship or readers, at least), and rarely do they share a common origin (for that, see comparative Indo-European pantheons); they are simply gods of various cultures whom the Greeks or Romans identified (either explicitly in surviving works, or as supported by the analyses of modern scholars) with their own gods and heroes. This system is easily seen in the names of the days of the week, which were frequently translated according to the interpretio.

In art
Examples of deities depicted in syncretic compositions by means of interpretatio graeca or romana:

See also
 Aion (deity)
 Mystery religions
 Honji suijaku, in Japan
 Interpretatio germanica
 Interpretatio Christiana
 Celtic deities
 Proto-Indo-European religion, a reconstructed religion that relates Greek deities to other Indo-European deities
 Shinbutsu-shūgō, a Japanese amalgamation of Buddhist and Shinto deities
 Syncretism
 Three teachings, Buddhism, Confucianism and Taoism as harmonious aggregate in Chinese philosophy.

References

Further reading

 Kaspers, Wilhelm. "Germanische Götternamen." Zeitschrift Für Deutsches Altertum Und Deutsche Literatur 83, no. 2 (1951): 79–91. www.jstor.org/stable/20654522.

Deities in classical mythology
Etruscan mythology
Foreign relations of ancient Rome
Gallo-Roman religion
Greek mythology
Hellenistic religion
Jews and Judaism in the Roman Republic and the Roman Empire
Latin religious words and phrases
Religion in the Roman Empire
Religious pluralism
Religious syncretism
Roman mythology
Phoenician mythology
Religious interpretation